Zafar Choudhary (Urdu: ظفر چودھری)  is an Indian journalist, author, policy analyst, and practitioner of peace-building. He is founder and Chief Editor of The Dispatch. Educated at the London School of Economics and Political Science, he is Asia Society Fellow (2012). He was born in a remote village Rehan in district Rajouri, Jammu and Kashmir in 1975.

India-Pakistan Track II Relations
Choudhary is a well-known name in the India-Pakistan Track II process with a focus on peacebuilding in Jammu and Kashmir. He has worked with Conciliation Resources (London) since 2008 on a comprehensive India-Pakistan initiatives to build peace in the region. He has worked closely with government officials, political and civil society actors across the political divides in both sides of the Line of Control to create unique and exemplary institutes like a Joint Chamber of Commerce and Industry and a Consortium of Vice-Chancellors, drawing members from both sides of India-Pakistan divide in Kashmir.

Association with reputed institutions
Choudhary has also remained associated with the Royal United Services Institute, United Kingdom Pugwash Conferences on Science and World Affairs  USIP  (Washington DC), Berghof Foundation (Berlin), IPCS (Siem Reap, Cambodia), United Services Institute, New Delhi, Institute of Peace and Conflict Studies , New Delhi the WISCOMP, New Delhi and a number of other Think Tanks and Universities in India and abroad and was a part of the deliberations going on the issue of Jammu and Kashmir.

Expert in Jammu and Kashmir affairs
An expert on Jammu and Kashmir affairs, Choudhary has been widely recognised and interviewed by the international and national press on Jammu and Kashmir affairs, India-Pakistan relations, national security and geo-politics. His interviews or reference to his work have appeared in influential international and national newspapers, magazines and television channels such as The Guardian, UK  ; Aljazeera, Arab News, BBC London, ThePrint, The Wire, Scroll.in, The Citizen, Kashmir Observer TRT World, Anti War among others.

Career
He is the founding editor of Epilogue, a Jammu -based English news magazine published in India. 
Presently, he is editor in chief and the Founder of The Dispatch, an Indian online digital news service supplemented by channels on YouTube and Facebook to disseminate and distribute rich news content. He also writes occasionally  for The Hindu, Rising Kashmir and other newspapers.

Book -Kashmir Conflict and Muslims of Jammu 
Choudhary's book titled Kashmir Conflict and Muslims of Jammu (2015) addresses a historical gap in scholarship on Jammu and Kashmir. The story of the Muslims of Jammu, their political views, and pro-India outlook, was not known before this book was published. In an interview to Daily O of the India Today group, Choudhary said, the Muslims of Jammu are lost in oblivion. Jammu and Kashmir's leading English daily newspaper Daily Excelsior termed the book a "masterly narrative of Kashmir conflict and identity profile of Jammu Muslims". The Friday Times of Lahore said "Zafar's book in itself is the first of its kind, as successive historians only made passing references to the Jammu massacre. Its launch kick-started a fresh debate around the subject". In an article titled "Of the 'Other' and 'Outsider', India's leading English daily The Hindu said, "Choudhary's is an important work which will, I hope, help in addressing the impressions of Muslims of Jammu division that they are taken for granted, that the government of India, and the world, seeking to bring to final resolution the conflicts that have plagued the state of J&K over the last century, seek primarily to determine simply the views of different sections of the community residents in Kashmir."

Rewards and recognition
Choudhary won the State Award from the Government of Jammu and Kashmir in 2017 for his contribution in the field of journalism. He has also been awarded by a number of Universities, NGOs for his outstanding work in the field of journalism and research.

Education
He is a graduate of the London School of Economics.

See also
 Shahid Iqbal Choudhary
 Shujaat Bukhari
 Muzamil Jaleel
 Javaid Rahi

External links
 The Dispatch website

References

1977 births
Living people
21st-century Indian journalists
Writers about the Kashmir conflict
Alumni of the London School of Economics
Jammu and Kashmir
Indian male journalists
21st-century Indian Muslims
Pahari Pothwari people
Mass media in Jammu and Kashmir
Writers from Jammu and Kashmir